Chota Ambona is a small village close to Dhanbad, Jharkhand, India. It was known for the now closed Khandelwal Glass Factory. Currently it houses one of the largest concrete sleeper manufacturing units under Eastern Railway.

References

Villages in Dhanbad district